Witness: Five Plays from the Gospel of Luke was a series of five 45-minute radio plays by Nick Warburton based on the Gospel of Luke, first broadcast from 17 to 21 December 2007 (i.e. in the week before Christmas Day) as part of BBC Radio 4's Afternoon Play strand.  They were directed by Jonquil Panting.  Jesus and the disciples were portrayed in regional accents, a trope in radio retellings of the Gospel stories since Dorothy L. Sayers' The Man Born to Be King.  Upper class characters were presented in Received Pronunciation, city-folk in Jerusalem in London working-class accents, and Romans such as Pilate and the Centurion in an American accent.

Each play was followed by a 15-minute documentary presented by Ernie Rea on the themes covered in the preceding play.

Episodes
The Lake - The calling of Peter and Andrew
Outsiders - Mary Magdalene, Joanna, Simon and other outsiders are embraced by Jesus
Jerusalem - Jesus and his disciples arrive in Jerusalem, and Judas decides to betray him
Tested - The Passion, as seen by Pontius Pilate, Caiaphas, Peter, and the Virgin Mary
Beginners - Mary recalls her son's birth in the days after the Crucifixion, and then the disciples witness the Resurrection

Cast
Jesus - Tom Goodman-Hill
Peter - Peter Firth
Andrew - Paul Copley
Judas - Paul Hilton (2-4)
Mary - Penelope Wilton (4&5)
Caiaphas - Robin Soans (3&4)
Magdalene - Lorraine Ashbourne (2&5)
Joanna - Rachel Atkins (2&5)

Episode 1
Baptist - Stephen Greif
Elder - Sam Dale
Possessed man - John Lloyd Fillingham
John - Simon Treves
Woman - Laura Molyneux
Tempter - Peter Marinker

Episode 2
Woman - Maxine Peake
Simon - Peter Marinker
Friend of the sick man - Ben Crowe
Child - Poppy Friar

Episode 3
Rich man - Simon Treves
Pharisee - Alex Lanipekun
Martha - Joannah Tincey
Zacchaeus - Sam Dale
Tempter - Peter Marinker
Woman - Anna Bengo
Lawyer - Sam Pamphilon
Child - Skye Bennett

Episode 4
Baker - Ben Crowe
Centurion - Peter Marinker
Girl - Anna Bengo
Guard - Lloyd Thomas
Pilate - Colin Stinton

Episode 5
Angel - Julian Bleach
Simeon - David de Keyser
Joseph of Arimathea - Ben Onwukwe
Young Mary - Laura Molyneux
Cleopas - Sam Pamphilon

External links
Afternoon Play

Portrayals of Jesus on radio
British plays
BBC Radio 4 programmes
Gospel of Luke
Caiaphas
Cultural depictions of Pontius Pilate